Marcello Cerruti (Genoa, July 16, 1808 – Rome, March 12, 1896) was an Italian diplomat and politician. He was appointed senator of the Kingdom of Italy in 1870.

Biography 
A fellow student of Giuseppe Mazzini, he entered the diplomatic career of the Kingdom of Sardinia in 1825, at the consulate of Constantinople; he was then assigned to Tripoli (1831), Tunis (1836), Milan (1837) and Cyprus (1841). In 1845 he was a member of the Institute of Archaeological Correspondence in Rome and, in 1847, of the Eastern Archaeological Society of Germany.

After a short period at the Ministry, Cerrutti was chosen as Sardinian consul in Belgrade (1849). Here he provoked the protests of the Austrian government for his action in favor of the Hungarian refugees and the Italian legionaries who took refuge in the Serbian capital.

In 1850 he was recalled to Turin and, two years later, he was appointed Chargé d'affaires and Sardinian consul general in Brazil; in 1858 he held the same post in Buenos Aires. After being sent by Cavour on a special mission to Constantinople (September 1860), he was later appointed Secretary General of the Ministry of Foreign Affairs, a position he held from March 26, 1863, to December 30, 1866.

Subsequently he was plenipotentiary minister in Berne (1867), in Washington (1868), in The Hague (April 1869) and in Madrid (July 1869). On December 7, 1870, he was put to rest and, five days later, appointed Senator of the Kingdom.

References

Honors 
 Grand cordon of the Order of Saints Maurice and Lazarus – January 27, 1867

 Officer of the Order of Leopold of Belgium

 Officer of the Legion of Honor

 Officer of the Order of the Savior

External links 
 Marcello Cerruti sul sito dell'Enciclopedia italiana, on treccani.it.
 Photos of Marcello Cerruti in Immaginario Diplomatico - collection of historical photos of Italian Diplomats by Stefano Baldi

Ambassadors of Italy to the United States
Ambassadors of Italy to Argentina
Ambassadors of Italy to Spain
Ambassadors of Italy to the Ottoman Empire
19th-century Italian diplomats
1808 births
1896 deaths